Kenneth Charles Swofford (July 25, 1933 – November 1, 2018) was an American film and television actor. With his burly build and distinctive red hair he was often cast in villain, police officer or 'everyman' roles.

Between 1962 and 1995, Swofford's film credits included Thelma & Louise, Skyjacked, Black Roses and The Andromeda Strain, while his TV career during the same period was prolific: he appeared on such television series as Gunsmoke, Police Story, The Rockford Files, Simon & Simon, Fame, Switch, The Oregon Trail, Rich Man, Poor Man Book II, Murder, She Wrote, and as a cast member of the mystery series Ellery Queen.

Life and career
Born to Howard and Goldie Swofford on July 25, 1933, Ken Swofford graduated from Southern Illinois University-Carbondale in 1959 with a Bachelor of Science degree in theater.

In an interview in 1976 the distinctive, red-headed actor described the advantages of an acting career as spending more time with his children and having the freedom to do any job. "If you're an actor, you can do anything. I have cleaned carpets, painted houses, worked on loading docks. It didn't bother me, because I could always act and enjoy myself."

He met and married Barbee Biggs in summer stock in 1958; the couple had several children. In a Los Angeles Times interview in 1985 titled "Autistic Youth Thrives in Large, Loving Family", the Swoffords discussed bringing up their autistic son Brendan at home.

In 1989, Swofford was convicted of felony drunk driving and sentenced to 28 months in prison, after which he made a comeback and continued to work steadily until retiring in 1995. In 2001, he supplied the voice of the coach in Recess: School's Out, and played Officer White in Teacher's Pet (2004), which was his last role before retiring permanently. Nonetheless, in 2018 he voiced the title character of Happy the Angry Polar Bear in a film written and directed by his grandson, Brandon.

Death
Swofford died on November 1, 2018. His death was announced by his grandson Brandon on Twitter.

Filmography

Captain Newman, M.D. (1963) — Patient (uncredited)
Father Goose (1964) — Helmsman, Submarine USS Sailfin (uncredited)
First to Fight (1967) — O'Brien
Gunfight in Abilene (1967) — Rebel Soldier (uncredited)
How Much Loving Does a Normal Couple Need? (1967) — Barney Rickert / ex-detective
The Lawyer (1970) — Charlie O'Keefe
The Andromeda Strain (1970) — Toby (technician)
Bless the Beasts and Children (1971) — Wheaties
Skyjacked (1972) — John Bimonte
One Little Indian (1973) — Pvt. Dixon
A Cry for Help (1975, TV Movie) — Paul Church
The Black Bird (1975) — Brad McCormack
The Domino Principle (1977) — Ditcher
Sultan and the Rock Star (1980, TV Movie) - George McKinzie
S.O.B. (1981) — Harold Harrigan
Annie (1982) — Weasel
Bridge Across Time (1985, TV Movie) — Ed Nebel
Hunter's Blood (1986) — Al Coleman
The Stepford Children (1987, TV Movie) — Frank Gregson
Black Roses (1988) — Mayor Farnsworth
Thelma & Louise (1991) — Major
The Taking of Beverly Hills (1991) — Coach
Cops n Roberts (1995)
Recess: School's Out (2001) — Coach (voice)
Teacher's Pet (2004) — Officer White (voice)

Television

Surfside 6 (1962) — Garth
The Big Valley (1966) — Wes
Cimarron Strip (1967) — Christie
Gunsmoke (1967–1975) — Dunbar / Jake Fielder / Harkey / Dirk / Speer / Harry / Bronk / Loomis / Guffy / Sugar John / Bo Warrick
I Spy (1968) — Clay
Daniel Boone (1968) — Mick O'Toole
Adam-12 (1968) — Floyd Delman
The Virginian (1968–1969) — Seth Pettit / Wrengell
Here Come the Brides (1969) — Janitor / Gil
The F.B.I. (1969) — Honky-tonk bookkeeper
The Odd Couple (1970) — Cop
The Intruders (1970) — Pomerantz
Mission: Impossible (1970–1971) — Deputy Mayor Charles Peck / Florian Vaclav
The Partridge Family (1970–1974) — Coach / Monty
The Rookies (1972–1973) — Mr. Felker
The Streets of San Francisco (1973) — Herman Ledeker, Bus Driver
Columbo: Candidate for Crime (1973) — Harry Stone
The Waltons (1974) — Red Turner
Kung Fu (1974) — Dr. Tracer / Max Frazer
Paper Moon (1974) — Angus
Police Story (1974–1977) — Lieutenant / Lieutenant Pete Telenda / Officer Turner / Alfonso Taluga / Morgan
Petrocelli (1975–1976) — Lt. John Clifford / Lieutenant John Clifford / Phillip Armor
Ellery Queen (1975–1976) — Frank Flannigan
The Rockford Files (1975–1979) — Col. John 'Howling Mad' Smith / Carl Wronko / DEA Agent Al Jollett / FBI Agent Patrick / P.I. Floyd Ross
The Six Million Dollar Man (1977–1978) — Dan Kelly / Roy Palmer
The Eddie Capra Mysteries (1978) — J.J. Devlin
Battlestar Galactica (1979) — General Maxwell in "Experiment in Terra" 
How the West Was Won (1979) — Grimes
Walking Tall (1981) — Ed Morgan
The Incredible Hulk (1981) — Johnny
Fantasy Island (1981) — Fix
Trapper John, M.D. (1982–1983) — The Chief / Mr. Stone
Dynasty (1982–1988) — Lt. Holliman / Lieutenant
Simon & Simon (1982–1988) — Chester Sullivan — SIA Liaison / Chief of Security Warren Parton / Lloyd Getz
Knots Landing (1983) — Sheriff Pickett
Fame (1983–1985) — Principal Quentin Morloch 
Hardcastle and McCormick (1985) — Chuck Foster
The A-Team (1985) — Park Ranger Roy Sherman
Murder, She Wrote (1985–1992) — Lt. Catalano / Sheriff Tugman / Sid Sharkey / Grover Barth / Leo Kowalski
Knight Rider (1986) — Nick O'Brien
Remington Steele (1986) — Michael Harrigan
Scarecrow and Mrs. King (1986) — Mr. Davis
Falcon Crest (1987) — March Ridley
Max Headroom (1987) — Gorrister
Ohara (1987) — Crowley
Highway to Heaven (1987) — Jack Kelly
Our House (1988) — Baxter
The Highwayman (1988) — The Mayor
Murphy's Law (1988) — Max Corkle
Mancuso, F.B.I. 
(1989)
The Wonder Years (1988) — Al (Kevin Father's Chief)
The New Adam-12 (1991) — Mr. Crebs
Matlock (1991) — Ned Salem
Baywatch (1991–1992) — Lyle Connors
Diagnosis: Murder (1994) — Rupert Leverton

References

External links

1933 births
2018 deaths
People from Du Quoin, Illinois
American male film actors
American male television actors
American prisoners and detainees
Male actors from Illinois
20th-century American male actors
Southern Illinois University Carbondale alumni
21st-century American male actors